Dietrich Hollinderbäumer (born 16 August 1942) is a German-Swedish actor. He is known for his role in Downfall as Robert Ritter von Greim and for playing Adam in the German Netflix series Dark.

Early life 
Hollinderbäumer was born to a Swedish mother and a German father. His mother immigrated to Germany and met her husband there. When Dietrich was 9 in 1951, his parents separated and he and his then two-year-old brother moved to Stockholm. Hollinderbäumer studied at Royal Dramatic Theatre in Stockholm. From 1968 to 1972 he worked for Westfälisches Landestheater. From 1978 to 1983 he worked at Theater & Orchester Heidelberg. From 1983 to 1988 he worked at Burgtheater in Wien. He worked as actor in German films and television programs.

Personal life
Hollinderbäumer has two children, who are also actors. He speaks German and Swedish at a native level and is fluent in English.

Filmography 

1974: Graf Yoster gibt sich die Ehre (TV Series) .... Der Papageienkäfig 
1989:  .... Seifert
1991: Die Männer vom K3 (TV Series, one episode) .... Wolfgang Lützow
1991: Eine erste Liebe
1991–2004: Ein Fall für Zwei (TV Series, twelve episodes) .... Prosecutor Sieber / Hartmann / Prosecutor Moebius / Kommissar Bigeler / Kommissar Schmiedek / Untersuchungsrichter / Tenberg / Prosecutor
1994: Wolffs Revier (TV Series, one episode) .... Walter Gersberg
1994: Die Kommissarin (TV Series, one episode) .... Haase
1997: Dr. Stefan Frank – Der Arzt, dem die Frauen vertrauen (TV Series, one episode)
1998: Tatort – Russisches Roulette (TV Series)
1998: Kommissar Rex (TV Series, one episode) .... Stefan Klein
1998: Vergewaltigt – Eine Frau schlägt zurück (TV Movie) .... Wagner
1998: Tatort – Gefallene Engel (TV Series) .... Dekan
1999: SOKO 5113 (TV Series, one episode)
1999: Der Fahnder (TV Series, one episode) .... Baumann
1999: Long Hello and Short Goodbye .... Kahnitz
1999: Medicopter 117 (TV Series, one episode) .... Dr. Bach
2000: Das Phantom (TV Movie) .... Baré
2000: Tatort – Die kleine Zeugin (TV Series) .... Robert
2000: Når mørket er forbi .... Krebs
2001: Nur mein Sohn war Zeuge (TV Movie) .... Bodenburg
2001: Im Namen des Gesetzes (TV Series, one episode) .... Prof. Dr. Eberhard Brunner
2001: Tatort – Exil! (TV Series) .... Dr. Kevin Lohmann
2001: Tatort – Hasard! (TV Series) .... Dr. Kevin Lohmann
2001: Erkan & Stefan gegen die Mächte der Finsternis .... Prof. Johns
2002: Therapie und Praxis (TV Movie) .... Reinhard Arnsberg
2002:  .... Gebhard
2002:  (TV Movie) .... John Kaun
2004: Alarm für Cobra 11 – Die Autobahnpolizei (TV Series, one episode) .... Roberto Leone
2004: Der Traum vom Süden (TV Movie) .... Erich
2004: Die Stunde der Offiziere (TV Movie) .... Generalfeldmarschall Erich von Manstein
2004: Einmal Bulle, immer Bulle (TV Series, six episodes) .... Bernd Reiff
2004: Der Untergang .... Generalfeldmarschall Robert Ritter von Greim
2004: Tatort – Abgezockt (TV Series) .... Max Hüllen
2004: Saint Rita (TV Movie) .... Ferdinando Mancini
2004–2009: In aller Freundschaft (TV Series, two episodes) .... Armin Wittgenstein / Johannes Paintner
2005–2018: Pastewka (TV Series) .... Volker Pastewka
2006: Die Rosenheim-Cops (TV Series, one episode) .... Walter Ammon
2006: Lulu (TV Movie) .... Dr. Goll
2006: Cologne P.D. (one episode) .... Hermann Lahnstein
2006: SOKO Kitzbühel (TV Series, one episode) .... Ralf Renner
2006: Zwei am großen See (TV Series, one episode) .... Dr. Eberhard Perny
2006: Vier Minuten .... Pater Vincens
2006: Joy Division .... Grandpa
2006: Ein starkes Team – Zahn um Zahn (TV Series) .... Henry von Haase
2007–2017: Der Kommissar und das Meer (TV Series) ....	Jan Hagman
2007: Wilsberg – Unter Anklage (TV Series)
2007: Afrika, mon amour (TV Mini-Series)
2008: Bella Block – Reise nach China (TV Series) .... Dr. Scherwitz
2008: Ein Ferienhaus in Marrakesch (TV Movie) .... Norman Hopkins
2008: Putzfrau Undercover (TV Movie) .... Eckhard Windhorst
2008:  (TV Movie) .... Matthias Büsing
2008: The Swimsuit Issue .... Volker
2009–2018: heute-show (TV Series) .... Ulrich von Heesen / Teufel
2009: Diamantenhochzeit .... Vater Dähnert
2009: Augustinus (TV Movie) .... Macrobius
2010: Countdown – Die Jagd beginnt (TV Series, one episode) .... Hans-Jörg Bennat
2010: Kreuzfahrt ins Glück (TV Series) .... Peter May
2011: Der kalte Himmel (TV Movie) .... Psychiater
2011: Der letzte Bulle (TV Series, Mord auf Seite 1) .... Berthold von Baranki
2011: Försvunnen .... Peter
2011: Men Are Wired One Way, Women Another (TV Movie) .... Felix Brugger
2011: Die Brücke – Transit in den Tod (TV Series) .... Göran
2011: Allein gegen die Zeit (TV Series) .... Dr. Crohn
2011–2015: Reiff für die Insel .... Helge Quedens
2012: Komm, schöner Tod (TV Movie) .... Sebastian von Werding
2012: Die letzte Spur (TV Series, one episode) .... Rüdiger Herzog
2012: Drei Stunden .... Gott
2012: Alles bestens (TV Movie) .... Paul Rademacher
2012–2014: Add a Friend (TV Series) .... Gerd
2013: Küstenwache (TV Series, one episode) .... Dr. Werner Vosskamp
2013: Utta Danella – Sturm am Ehehimmel (TV Series) .... Paul Sommer
2014: Weiter als der Ozean (TV Movie)
2014: Real Buddy .... Nathan Hopkins
2015: Ein Sommer in Masuren (TV Movie) .... Jakub Wozniak
2015: SOKO 5113 (TV Series, one episode) .... Willibald Janker
2016: Hubert und Staller (Unter Wölfen) (TV Movie) .... Manfred Kröpf
2017: Der Kommissar und das Meer – In einem kalten Land (TV Series) .... Jan Hagman
2017: Rentnercops (TV Series, one episode)
2017: Das Pubertier (TV Series) .... Eberhard Maybacher
2017: Angst – Der Feind in meinem Haus (TV Movie) .... Hermann Tiefenthaler
2017: Schatz, nimm Du sie! .... Chefarzt
2019: Dark (TV Series, season 2, season 3) .... Adam / Jonas Kahnwald

Awards 
 2009, 2010, 2011, 2012: Deutscher Comedypreis as member of television program  heute-show on broadcaster ZDF
 2010: Jury-Preis "Bester Kurzfilm über 15 Minuten" by Palm Springs International Short Film Festival for Hermann
 2010: Adolf-Grimme-Preis as member of heute-show (ZDF)
 2011: Deutscher Fernsehpreis as member of heute-show (ZDF)
 2013: Deutscher Comedypreis as Best actor for  Pastewka (Nominination)
 2013: Adolf-Grimme-Preis for Add a friend

References

External links 
 
 Morgenpost.de: "Heute-Show"-Star Hollinderbäumer ist Herr der Nebenrollen (german)
 Express.de: Was macht der Mecker-Opa aus der heute show in der ARD Schnulze (german) 
 Der Westen.de: Dietrich Hollinderbäumer hält Kommissar Heldt auf Trab (german)
 Hörzu: Was man sehen sollte (german)
 TVSpielfilm.de: Dietrich Hollinderbäumer (german)

German male stage actors
German male film actors
German male television actors
20th-century German male actors
21st-century German male actors
1942 births
Actors from Essen
Living people
Swedish male stage actors
Swedish male film actors